Abdullah ibn Abdur-Rahman al-Ghudayyan (1926 – 1 June 2010) was a Saudi Arabian Islamic scholar, a leading proponent of the Salafi form of Islam and a member of the Saudi Council of Senior Scholars. His ancestry was of the tribe of Banu Anbar.

Career
In 1971 he was appointed as a member of the Council of Senior Scholars (Saudi Arabia).

In addition to his work with the Permanent Committee for Scholarly Research and Ifta in 1975 he began giving lessons to students at Imam Muhammad ibn Saud Islamic University within the Faculty of Sharia and Faculty of Fiqh.

When Abdullah ibn Humayd died in 1981, he overtook the role of giving Fatwa on the radio program Nur Ala Al-Darb, which has been described as "one of the oldest and most famous programs broadcast on the Quran radio channel,  where a number of major scholars answer questions and give fatwas."

Students 
Abdullah al-Ghudayyan had a number of notable students, including:

 Saleh Aal al-Sheikh, Minister of Islamic Affairs for Saudi Arabia
 Abdur-Rahman al-Sudais, Imam of the Grand Mosque in Mecca and President of the General Presidency for the Affairs of the Two Holy Mosques
 Saud al-Shuraim, imam and khatib of the Grand Mosque in Mecca
 Abd al-Kareem al-Khudayr, a member of the Saudi Council of Senior Scholars
Saad al-Shithri, a member of the Saudi Council of Senior Scholars

Death
Abdullah ibn Abdur-Rahman al-Ghudayyan died on Tuesday 1 June 2010.

References

1926 births
2010 deaths
Saudi Arabian Sunni Muslim scholars of Islam
Saudi Arabian Salafis
People from Riyadh Province
Academic staff of Imam Muhammad ibn Saud Islamic University